Berwyn is a temporarily closed 'L' station on the CTA's Red Line. It is located at 1121 West Berwyn Avenue in the Edgewater neighborhood of Chicago, Illinois. Four tracks pass through the station, but there is only single island platform in the center of the tracks. The two eastern tracks are temporarily out of service for construction and trains on both the Red and Purple Lines pass Berwyn on the western tracks without stopping. When it reopens, it will consist of an island platform with Red Line trains stopping on the inner tracks and Purple Line Express trains bypassing the station on the outer tracks. Berwyn is named for the Berwyn station in the community of the same name, which is west of Philadelphia. Many of the roads (and thus CTA stations) in the Edgewater neighborhood are named after stations on the former Pennsylvania Railroad Main Line.

History
The Northwestern Elevated Railroad extended its services north from Wilson to Central Street in Evanston in 1908, but they did not build a station at Berwyn Avenue until the tracks between Wilson and Howard were elevated onto an embankment between 1914 and 1922. This new station was built to a design by architect Charles P. Rawson; the date of opening is not known, but a station may have existed at Berwyn by 1916. At the time of its opening the station was named Edgewater Beach Station; the name was changed to Berwyn in the late 1950s, around about the time that Lake Shore Drive was extended from Foster Avenue to Hollywood Avenue destroying the namesake Edgewater beach.

Red & Purple Modernization Project
As part of Phase I of the Red & Purple Modernization Project, the station closed for demolition beginning on May 16, 2021 and a newly constructed station will reopen by December 2024. The new station will feature wider platforms, better lighting, and be accessible to passengers with disabilities.

Bus connections
CTA
  146 Inner Lake Shore/Michigan Express

Notes and references

Notes 

Station closed until further notice

References

External links

Berwyn Station Page CTA official site
Berwyn Avenue entrance from Google Maps Street View

CTA Red Line stations
Railway stations in the United States opened in 1916